Rainy Days may refer to:
Rainy Days (film), a 1928 Our Gang short silent comedy film
"Rainy Dayz", a 2002 song by Mary J Blige
"Rainy Dayz" (Raekwon song), 1996
Rainy Days, a 2005 album by XYZ
Rainy Days, a 2003 EP by Gentleman
"Rainy Days", a 1995 song by General Public

See also
Rainy Day (disambiguation)
"Rainy Days and Mondays", a 1971 song by the Carpenters